Jon Jackson may refer to:

Jon Jackson (politician), candidate in United States House of Representatives elections, 2008
Jon Jackson (figure skater) in 2002 Winter Olympics figure skating scandal

See also
Jonathan Jackson (disambiguation)
John Jackson (disambiguation)